Bocage's rock rat (Aethomys bocagei) is a species of rodent in the family Muridae.

It is found in Angola and Democratic Republic of the Congo.

Its natural habitats are subtropical or tropical dry forests, dry savanna, and moist savanna.

References

Mammals described in 1904
Taxa named by Oldfield Thomas
Aethomys
Rodents of Africa
Mammals of Angola
Mammals of the Democratic Republic of the Congo
Taxonomy articles created by Polbot